Map of places in Swansea compiled from this list
 See the list of places in Wales for places in other principal areas.

This is a list of cities, towns and villages in the principal area of Swansea, Wales.

 

A
Alltwen

B
Birchgrove, Bishopston, Blackpill, Blaen-Y-Maes, Bolgoed, Bon-y-maen, Brynhyfryd, Brynmelyn, Brynmill, Bryntywod, Burry Green

C
Cadle, Caemawr, Carnglas, Caswell, Cheriton, Clase, Clydach, Clyne, Cockett, Copley, Craigcefnparc, Crofty, Cwmbwrla, Cwmdu, Cwmfelin, Cwm Gwyn

D
Danygraig, Derwen Fawr, Dunvant

E
Enterprise Zone

F
Fairwood, Fairyhill, Felindre, Fforest, Fforestfach, Frederick Place

G
Garden Village, Garnswllt, Gendros, Gorseinon, Gowerton, Graig Trewyddfa, Greenhill, Grovesend

H
Hafod, Hendrefoilan, Hendy, Heol-Las, Horton

I
Ilston

J

K
Killay, Kingsbridge, Kittle, Knelston

L
Landore, Landimore, Langland, Leason, Llandewi, Llangennith, Llangyfelach, Llanmadoc, Llanmorlais, Llanrhidian, Llansamlet, Llethryd, Llewitha, Loughor

M
Manselton, Maritime Quarter, Mawr, Mayals, Mayhill, Middleton, Morfa, Morriston, Mount Pleasant, Mumbles, Murton, Mynydd-Bach, Mynydd Bach Y Glo

N
Newton, Nicholaston, Norton, North Hill,

O
Olchfa, Oldwalls, Overton, Oystermouth, Oxwich, Oxwich Green

P
Pantlasau, Parkmill, Penclawdd, Peniel Green, Penlan, Peniel Green, Penllergaer, Penmaen, Pennard, Penrice, Pentrebach, Pentrechwyth, Pentre-Dwr, Pentrepoeth, Penyrheol, Pitton, Pitton Green, Plasmarl, Pontarddulais, Pontlliw, Port Eynon, Portmead, Port Tennant, Poundffald

Q

R
Ravenhill, Reynoldston, Rhydypandy, Rhossili

S
SA1 Waterfront, Sandfields, Scurlage, Sketty, Sketty Park, Slade, Southgate, St. Thomas, Swansea, Swansea Docks

T
Thistleboon, Three Crosses, Tirdeunaw, Tircoed forest village, Tirpenry, Townhill, Treboeth, Tycoch

U
Uplands, Upper Killay

V

W
Waunarlwydd, Waun Wen, Wernffrwd, Wernfadog, West Cross, Winch Wen

X

Y
Ynysforgan, Ynystawe

Z

See also
List of places in Swansea (categorised)

Swansea-related lists
Swansea